Angels & Lovers is an album by the British pop musician Howard Jones. It was released in 1997 in Japan only. The album was re-released worldwide the following year as People, with some minor changes to the track listing.

The two songs that were on this album but not on People, "Angels And Lovers" and "When Lovers Confess", appeared on later CD singles.

Track listing

Roy Jones (co-writer of lyrics for tracks 4 and 5) is Howard's brother.

References

External links
Angels & Lovers at Discogs

Howard Jones (English musician) albums
1997 albums